Kaikoura Whakatau  (–1868) was a New Zealand tribal leader. Of Māori descent, he identified with the Ngai Tahu (South Island) iwi. He was born in New Zealand. 

Kaikoura lived in Oaro and was of the Ariki (senior) line.

References

1868 deaths
People from North Canterbury
Ngāi Tahu people
Year of birth unknown